Tom Leppard, born as Tom Wooldridge, also known as Leopard Man or the Leopard Man of Skye, (14 October 1935 – 12 June 2016) was an English-born soldier previously considered by Guinness World Records to be the world's most tattooed man and later recognised as the most tattooed senior citizen. He is said to have spent £5,500 on his extensive body modifications, which covered his skin nearly entirely with a leopard-like coloured pattern. He stated he did not feel any affiliation with leopards, and selected spots solely because they were easy for tattoo artists to do on a grand scale. Leppard was a Roman Catholic.

After 28 years service in the armed forces, including stints with the Royal Navy and then as a colour sergeant in the Rhodesian Special Forces, he moved from London to a small derelict bothy (hut) without amenities on the Isle of Skye, Scotland, where he lived for the next 20 years as a hermit until 2008. He would travel by kayak to the mainland to buy supplies and pick up his pension and groceries once a week. He then moved to a larger house in Broadford, Skye, followed by sheltered accommodation in a retirement home on the outskirts of the city of Inverness. Although he was surpassed by Guinness as the Most Tattooed Man by Lucky Diamond Rich, he was given another distinction having been named the "Most Tattooed Male Senior Citizen". He died aged 80, on 12 June 2016. After his death, his title went to Charles Helmke, whose body is 97.5% covered in tattoos.

Notes

1935 births
2016 deaths
People from Woodbridge, Suffolk
People known for being heavily tattooed
Place of birth missing
Rhodesian Army personnel by regiment
British Roman Catholics